Steironepion is a genus of sea snails, marine gastropod mollusks in the family Columbellidae, the dove snails.

Species
Species within the genus Steironepion include:

 Steironepion delicatus Ortea, Espinosa & Fernandez-Garcès, 2008
 Steironepion hancocki (Hertlein & Strong, 1939)
 Steironepion maculatum (C. B. Adams, 1850)
 Steironepion minor (Adams, 1845)
 Steironepion minus (C. B. Adams, 1845)
 Steironepion moniliferum (Sowerby I, 1844)
 Steironepion piperata (E.A. Smith, 1882)
 Steironepion pygmaeum (C. B. Adams, 1850)
 Steironepion tincta (Carpenter, 1864)

References

Columbellidae
Gastropod genera